Colombo is an Italian surname. Literally meaning "dove" it was given to orphans.

Geographical distribution
As of 2014, 66.9% of all known bearers of the surname Colombo were residents of Italy (frequency 1:458), 11.3% of Brazil (1:9,111), 7.2% of Argentina (1:2,986), 3.7% of the United States (1:48,838), 3.5% of Sri Lanka (1:2,965), 2.0% of France (1:16,850) and 1.1% of Venezuela (1:13,971).

In Italy, the frequency of the surname was higher than national average (1:458) only in one region: Lombardy (1:85).

People 
Achille Colombo Clerici, Italian lawyer, jurist, author, and community leader
Adolfo Colombo (1868-1953), the most recorded singer in Cuba up to 1925
Alain Colombo (born 1961), former French professional footballer
Alberto Colombo (born 1946), former Italian racing driver 
Alfredo Colombo (born 1921), retired Italian professional football player
Andrea Colombo (born 1974), Italian 100 metres sprinter 
Andrés Gerardo Colombo (born 1987), Argentine footballer
Angelo Colombo (born 1961), former Italian footballer 
Angelo Martino Colombo (1935–2014), Italian professional football player 
Armando Colombo, German engineer
Arrigo Colombo (1916-1998), Italian film producer 
Augusto Colombo (1902–1969), Italian painter
Bartolomeo Colombo (–1515), Italian explorer
Camila Colombo (born 1990), Uruguayan chess player
Charles Martin Colombo (1920–1986), American soccer player 
Christine Colombo Nilsen (born 1982), Norwegian football goalkeeper
Chrystian Colombo (born 1952), Argentine businessman and politician
Corrado Colombo (born 1979), Italian footballer
Claude Colombo (born 1960), French professional football referee
Cristoforo Colombo, the Italian language name of Italian explorer Christopher Columbus ( – 1506)
Domenico Colombo (Genoese: Domenego Corombo) (1418–1496), the father of navigator Christopher
Eduardo A. Folle Colombo (1922-1994), Uruguayan basketball player
Emilio Colombo (1920–2013), Prime Minister of Italy 1970–1972 and subsequently lifetime Senator
Eugenio Colombo (born 1953), Italian saxophonist and flautist 
Federico Colombo (born 1987), Italian professional golfer 
Felice Colombo (born 1937), Italian businessman, past chairman of A.C. Milan (1977–80)
Felipe Colombo Eguía (born 1983), Mexican-Argentine actor 
Filippo Colombo (born 1997), Swiss cross-country cyclist 
Franco Ermanno Colombo (born 1917), Italian professional football player
Furio Colombo (born 1931), Italian journalist and politician, former editor-in-chief of L'Unità
Gabriel Barcia-Colombo, American video artist
Gabriele Colombo (born 1972), Italian road bicycle racer
Gherardo Colombo (born 1946), Italian magistrate
Giacomo Colombo (1663–1730), Italian sculptor, painter and engraver in the late 17th century and early 18th century in Naples.
Gianni Colombo (1933–1993), Italian artist, member of the kinetic art movement
Gioacchino Colombo (1903–1988), Italian automobile engine designer
Giovanni Colombo (1902–1992), Cardinal and Archbishop of Milan
Giovanni Battista Innocenzo Colombo (1717–1801), Swiss painter and stage set designer.
Giuseppe Colombo (1920–1984), Italian mathematician, nicknamed "Bepi"
Horacio Colombo (born 1934), Argentine former basketball player
Ignacio Colombo (born 1995), Argentinian football forward 
Joe Cesare Colombo (1930–1971), Italian industrial designer
John Robert Colombo (born 1936), Canadian author
Joseph Anthony "Joe" Colombo Sr. (1923–1978), the boss of the Colombo crime family
Julio Colombo (born 1984), French retired football defender 
Jürgen Colombo (born 1949), German track cyclist
Kaitlin Colombo, American stand-up comedian, television personality, writer and actress
Laurent del Colombo (born 1959), French judoka
Lorenzo Colombo (born 2002), Italian footballer
Maria Luisa Colombo (born 1952), Italian singer, best known as Lu Colombo
Luca Colombo (cyclist) (born 1969), Italian racing cyclist
Luca Colombo (footballer) (born 1944), Italian centre-back football player
Luigi Colombo, Italian cyclist
Marc Colombo (born 1978), former American football offensive tackle 
Marcelo Daniel Colombo (born 1961), Argentine Roman Catholic bishop of La Rioja since 2013
Marco Colombo (born 1960), Italian swimmer
Maria Colombo (disambiguation), multiple people
Martín Colombo Rivero (born 1985), Uruguayan footballer 
Nazareno Fernández Colombo (born 1997), Argentine professional footballer 
Nicola Colombo (born 1968), Italian businessman, chairman of A.C. Monza Brianza 
Paolo Andrea Colombo (born 1960), Italian business executive
Pia Colombo (1934–1986), French singer of Franco-Italian origin
Raimundo Colombo (born 1955), Brazilian politician and member of the Social Democratic Party
Realdo Colombo ( – 1559), Italian anatomist and surgeon
Riccardo Colombo (born 1982), Italian football defender
Roberto Colombo (footballer) (born 1975), retired Italian football goalkeeper
Roberto Colombo (motorcyclist) (1927–1957), Italian Grand Prix motorcycle racer
Rodrigo Jesús Colombo (born 1992), Argentine professional football defender
Scipio Colombo (1910–2002), Italian dramatic baritone
Simone Colombo (born 1963), former professional tennis player from Italy
Ugo Colombo (real estate developer) (born 1961), Italian-born residential and commercial real estate developer in Miami
Umberto Colombo (athlete) (1880–?), Italian track and field athlete 
Umberto Colombo (footballer) (born 1933), retired Italian professional football midfielder
Umberto Colombo (scientist) (1927–2006), Italian scientist
Virginio Colombo (1885–1927), a prolific Italian architect later active in Buenos Aires
Vittorino Colombo (1925–1996), Italian Christian Democrat politician
Colombo crime family of New York
 Joseph Colombo (1923–1978), its namesake

Football (soccer) players
Angelo Colombo (born 1961), Italian midfielder
Charlie Colombo (1920–1986), American defender
Corrado Colombo (born 1979), Italian striker
Julio Colombo (born 1984), French (Guadeloupean) defender
Luca Colombo (footballer), (born 1984) Italian defender
Riccardo Colombo (born 1982), Italian defender
Roberto Colombo (footballer) (born 1975), Italian goalkeeper

See also
Columbus (disambiguation)
Columbo (TV series)
Coulomb (disambiguation)
Colón (disambiguation)

References

Italian-language surnames
Surnames of Italian origin
Surnames from nicknames